Sukra Munda is an Indian politician from the state of West Bengal. He is a member of the West Bengal Legislative Assembly. He represented the Nagrakata constituency in Jalpaiguri district after winning the 2016 West Bengal Legislative Assembly election. He resigned from the party on 19 December 2020 and joined the Bharatiya Janata Party.

References

External links 
West Bengal Legislative Assembly

West Bengal MLAs 2016–2021
Living people
Trinamool Congress politicians from West Bengal
Year of birth missing (living people)
Santali people
Bharatiya Janata Party politicians from West Bengal